Andreyevskoye is a rural locality (a selo) and the administrative center of Andreyevskoye Rural Settlement, Alexandrovsky District, Vladimir Oblast, Russia. The population was 1,062 as of 2010. There are 19 streets.

Geography 
Andreyevskoye is located 17 km east of Alexandrov (the district's administrative centre) by road. Prokofyevo is the nearest rural locality.

References 

Rural localities in Alexandrovsky District, Vladimir Oblast
Alexandrovsky Uyezd (Vladimir Governorate)